Caroline Louise of Waldeck and Pyrmont (14 August 1748 – 18 August 1782), was a Princess of Waldeck and Pyrmont by birth and Duchess of Courland by marriage.

Early life
Karoline Luise was born as the eldest daughter of Karl August, Prince of Waldeck and Pyrmont, and his wife Christiane Henriette, Countess Palatine of Zweibrücken-Birkenfeld-Bischweiler.

Marriage and issue
She married the Peter von Biron, Duke of Courland, on 15 October 1765.  The relationship between Caroline and Peter was unhappy, and evidently, he abused her while drunk. The union produced only one son, who was stillborn on 16 November 1766. Caroline and Peter were divorced in 1772.

Notes

References
 Waldeck. GENEALOGY.EU. Проверено 9 мая 2013. Архивировано из первоисточника 17 мая 2013.
 Перейти к: 1 2 И. Курукин. Бирон
 Последний Герцог. О жизни и кончине Герцога Курланд и Ливония Петра Эрнста фон Бирон. Александр Рожинцев

1748 births
1782 deaths
18th-century Latvian people
Duchesses of Courland
Princesses of Waldeck and Pyrmont
Daughters of monarchs